Son of a Gunfighter (Spanish: El Hijo del Pistolero) is a 1965 Spanish-American Western film directed by Paul Landres. It was the last MGM film to be shot in CinemaScope.

Russ Tamblyn was cast as "Son of a Gunfighter" in Quentin Tarantino's Django Unchained as a homage to this film.

Plot
Along the Mexican–American border, outlaws rob a bank then attack a stagecoach and find themselves defeated with the help of an ace gunman who seems to be looking for the group leader. After being injured in a shoot-out with bandidos, the young man continues his quest, aided by the Mexican rancher the bandits were trying to rob.

Cast

See also
List of American films of 1965

References

External links

1965 films
Films shot in Spain
1965 Western (genre) films
CinemaScope films
American Western (genre) films
Spanish Western (genre) films
English-language Spanish films
Metro-Goldwyn-Mayer films
1960s English-language films
1960s American films